Ellis is a city in Ellis County, Kansas, United States.  As of the 2020 census, the population of the city was 1,958.

History 
The Kansas Pacific Railway built a water station at the site of present-day Ellis in 1867 and then purchased the site under the Homestead Act. Three years later, in 1870, the U.S. Post Office Department opened a post office at Ellis, marking the town's foundation. Kansas Pacific laid out the town in 1873, establishing a depot, a hotel, and a few shops. That same year, settlers from Syracuse, New York, and later from Louisville, Kentucky, arrived to work for the railroad. The first church opened in Ellis in 1873, the first school in 1874. Starting in 1875 and for the rest of the 1870s, Ellis was a cowtown, serving as a shipping point for cattle herds from the south. Bukovina Germans began settling in the area in 1886. Ellis incorporated as a city in January 1888.

Long ago, Ellis (as well as Hays) was once a sundown town, where African Americans were not welcome after dark.

Geography
Ellis is located at  (38.936211, -99.559269), at an elevation of 2,120 feet (646 m).

Ellis lies on the western edge of the Smoky Hills region of the Great Plains. Big Creek, a tributary of the Smoky Hill River, runs east through the city and has been dammed to form a long, narrow reservoir, Big Creek Lake.

Climate
On average in Ellis, January is the coolest month, and July is both the warmest month and the wettest month. The hottest temperature recorded in Ellis was 110 °F (43 °C) in 2003; the coldest temperature recorded was -24 °F (-31 °C) in 1989.

Demographics

2010 census
As of the 2010 census, there were 2,062 people, 868 households, and 556 families residing in the city. The racial makeup of the city was 97.9% White, 0.2% African American, 1.0% from other races, and 0.8% from two or more races. Hispanics and Latinos of any race were 3.0% of the population.

There were 868 households, of which 31.0% had children under the age of 18 living with them, 52.6% were married couples living together, 4.0% had a male householder with no wife present, 7.4% had a female householder with no husband present, and 35.9% were non-families. 31.5% of all households were made up of individuals, and 12.5% had someone living alone who was 65 years of age or older. The average household size was 2.32, and the average family size was 2.91.

In the city, the population was spread out, with 25.1% under the age of 18, 6.7% from 18 to 24, 26.0% from 25 to 44, 26.7% from 45 to 64, and 15.5% who were 65 years of age or older. The median age was 38.1 years. For every 100 females, there were 90.9 males. For every 100 females age 18 and over, there were 88.6 males age 18 and over.

The median income for a household in the city was $40,682, and the median income for a family was $57,750. Males had a median income of $40,511 versus $25,982 for females.  The per capita income for the city was $22,568. 6.8% of families and 10.9% of the population were below the poverty line, including 11.5% of those under age 18 and 13.8% of those age 65 or over.

Economy
As of 2012, 69.3% of the population over the age of 16 was in the labor force. 1.4% was in the armed forces, and 67.9% was in the civilian labor force with 66.5% being employed and 1.5% unemployed. The composition, by occupation, of the employed civilian labor force was:  32.1% in management, business, science, and arts; 24.3% in sales and office occupations; 14.8% in production, transportation, and material moving; 14.5% in service occupations; and 14.2% in natural resources, construction, and maintenance. The three industries employing the largest percentages of the working civilian labor force were:  educational services, and health care and social assistance (28.8%); retail trade (14.9%); and construction (11.3%).

The cost of living in Ellis is relatively low; compared to a U.S. average of 100, the cost of living index for the community is 81.1. As of 2012, the median home value in the city was $85,300, the median selected monthly owner cost was $1,036 for housing units with a mortgage and $397 for those without, and the median gross rent was $564.

Government
Ellis has a mayor-council form of government with a city council consisting of six members. The mayor and all council members are elected for two-year terms. The council meets on the first and third Mondays of each month.

Ellis lies within Kansas's 1st U.S. Congressional District. For the purposes of representation in the Kansas Legislature, the city is located in the 40th district of the Kansas Senate and the 110th district of the Kansas House of Representatives.

Education

Primary and secondary education
Unified School District 388 is based in Ellis and operates two public schools in the city:
Washington Grade School (Grades K-6)
Ellis High School (7-12)

The Roman Catholic Diocese of Salina oversees one Catholic school in Ellis:  St. Mary Grade School (Pre-K-6).

The Ellis Railroaders have won the following Kansas State High School championships:
 1985 Boys Track & Field - Class 3A 
 2009 Girls Track & Field - Class 2A 
2016 Speech - Class 2A
2017 Speech - Class 2A
2018 Speech - Class 2A

Infrastructure

Transportation
Interstate 70 and U.S. Route 40 run concurrently east-west immediately north of Ellis. Kansas Highway 247 (K-247) runs north-south from I-70 to 3rd Street in northern Ellis.

Union Pacific Railroad operates one freight rail line, the Kansas Pacific (KP) line, through Ellis. It runs east-west through the city.

Utilities
The city government's Public Works department is responsible for sanitation, sewer maintenance, and water provision and distribution. Midwest Energy, Inc. provides electricity to local residents. Eagle Communications and Golden Belt Telephone provide landline telephone service and offer cable television. Most residents use natural gas for heating fuel; service is provided by Midwest Energy, Inc.

Media
The Ellis Review is the local newspaper, published weekly.

Ellis is in the Wichita-Hutchinson, Kansas television market.

Culture

Points of interest
Ellis is the site of Walter P. Chrysler Boyhood Home and Museum. Chrysler, founder of the Chrysler Corporation, grew up in Ellis. When he was 17, he began his career working in the railroad roundhouse, where he became a machinist's apprentice and developed his expertise for metal working and machinery. In the summer of 1993, the Chrysler Corporation recognized Chrysler's hometown by sponsoring a parade and Chrysler festival, attended by several members of the Chrysler family. A prototype Dodge Viper was loaned to the museum for one year.

Founded in 1994, the Ellis Railroad Museum features items and photographs from Ellis's railroading past. A  model train exhibit is also on display. Outside the museum is a miniature railroad that runs on a one-mile (1.6 km) loop track, called the BK&E Railroad. This stands for the "Buddy King and Ellis Railroad", named for its primary donor the late Francis "Buddy" King, a former mayor of Ellis who died in office in 1994.

Notable people

Notable individuals who were born in and/or have lived in Ellis include:
 Martha L. Addis (1878-1942), jeweler in Topeka
Walter Chrysler (1875-1940), founder of the Chrysler Corporation

Gallery
 Historic Images of Ellis, Special Photo Collections at Wichita State University Library

References

Further reading

 Guide Map of the Best and Shortest Cattle Trail to the Kansas Pacific Railway; Kansas Pacific Railway Company; 1875. (Read Online)(Map)

External links

 City of Ellis
 Ellis - Directory of Public Officials
 Ellis Railroad Museum 
 Historic Images of Ellis, Wichita State University Library
 Ellis city map, KDOT
 Topo Map of Ellis area, USGS

Bukovina German diaspora
Cities in Kansas
German-American culture in Kansas
Cities in Ellis County, Kansas
1870 establishments in Kansas
Populated places established in 1870
Sundown towns in Kansas